Robert Arzumanyan (also called Arzoumanian) (born 24 July 1985 in Yerevan, Armenian SSR) is an Armenian former international footballer who played as a defender and current manager of FC Noah.

Club career

Pyunik
Arzumanyan grew up playing for the youth team of Pyunik Yerevan. Every year Robert improved. Having gained confidence in his game, Robert became an indispensable player. In 2005, a translation in the first team was made and Arzumanyan competed for the senior side after he turned 18. Playing with the senior club, he did not get lost, but instead played in great strength. The results of the good team did not take long. Results of the 2005 Armenian Premier League revealed that the best player to take part in the Armenian Premier League for the first time was Robert Arzumanyan. While Arzumanyan played for Pyunik, the club won the 2003 Armenian Premier League, 2004 Armenian Premier League, 2005 Armenian Premier League, 2006 Armenian Premier League and 2007 Armenian Premier League, won the 2004 Armenian Cup and won the 2003 Armenian Supercup, 2004 Armenian Supercup and 2006 Armenian Supercup.

Randers
Good performances in subsequent seasons drew the attention of foreign breeders. On 17 January 2008, Robert signed a contract for 1 year with the Danish club Randers FC. After the 2008–09 season, he was one of the key players on the team and had made himself a first team regular on the team following some good and stable performances. On 29 August 2008, Robert extended his contract with Randers for 4 years. In the 2009–10 season, he was less likely to appear on the field because of the coach's idea of a new head coach. After the season and after the successful games played in the national team at the UEFA Euro 2012 on arrival at the club, it became clear that the coaching staff moved Arzumanyan to transfer. The reason for this decision is likely that Arzumanyan and his agent were in favor of a likely passage in the winter transfer window in any other European club.

Jagiellonia Białystok
In January 2011, there was information about the interest of the player's services in Śląsk Wrocław, where Arzumanyan was interested in playing. He performed well during the training camps of the team, but Arzumanyan did not become a player of the club. The reason for not signing the contract is the commissions which demanded the agent of Robert Arzumanyan, Manual Kildanovich. Śląsk eventually decided not to sign a contract with the player. As a result, he signed with Jagiellonia Białystok in January 2011 on a three and a half-year contract. Soon, because of the change of head coach and injuries, Arzumanyan did not get to bid for the match. The same coach of Jagiellonia did not see him in the team and advised him to change the club.

SKA-Energiya
On 23 July, Arzumanyan came to Saransk to see the local club FC Mordovia Saransk. On 26 July, with the team, he went to Krasnodar, and back to Saransk. Some days later, the head coach of Mordovia explained the rejection of the services of Arzumanyan as that there was too little time was to see his full potential. And given that the season had already started and the players trained in a specific mode, which was different from the training at the training camp. However, Arzumanyan left a positive impression. Arzumanyan ended up joining FC SKA-Energiya Khabarovsk and had signed a one-year deal with the club in September 2012. But the club came under new management in December 2012, resulting in roster changes. He left the Russian club on 18 January 2013.

Aktobe
The following month Arzumanyan signed a contract with Kazakh club FC Aktobe valid until December 2014. He had his first match for the new club on 9 March 2013 in the first round of the Kazakhstan Premier League.

Amkar Perm
In July 2014, Arzumanyan signed a contract agreement with Amkar Perm, starting in January 2015, at the end of his Aktobe contract.

In February 2016, Arzumanyan went on trial with Kazakhstan Premier League side FC Shakhter Karagandy. Amkar agreed on a loan deal with Shakhter on 17 February 2016.

On 7 February 2017, Arzumanyan's contract with Amkar was terminated by mutual consent.

In February 2018, after a year without a club, Arzumanyan began training with FC Banants.

On 20 October, after Artsakh FC's loss to Lori FC, Artsakh Head Coach Rafael Nazaryan announced that Arzumanyan had retired from football after persistent injuries without playing a game for Artsakh.

International career
Arzumanyan is also one of the key defenders of the Armenia national team and has participated in 63 international matches and scored 4 goals since his debut in an away friendly match against Kuwait on 18 March 2005. He scored his first international goal for Armenia in a Euro 2008 qualifying match against Kazakhstan. The match happened on 2 June 2007 and Arzumanyan scored the goal at the 31st minute on David Loria.

On 7 March 2016 he stated about the end of his international career.

Coaching career
After retiring from professional football, Arzumanyan was Assistant Manager of Armenian Premier League club FC Pyunik. Arzumanyan left his role at FC Pyunik on 5 May 2020.

On 15 July 2020, Arzumanyan was appointed as manager of Urartu-2. On 10 March 2021, Arzumanyan was appointed as manager of FC Urartu. He left his position in June 2022. On 23 August 2022, he was presented as the new manager of FC Noah.

Style of play
His strengths noted are his speed and ability to play on the bottom field.

Career statistics

Club

International

Statistics accurate as of match played 11 October 2015

International goals

Honours

Club
Pyunik Yerevan
Armenian Premier League (5): 2003, 2004, 2005, 2006, 2007
Armenian Cup (1): 2004
Armenian Supercup (3): 2003, 2004, 2006

Aktobe
Kazakhstan Super Cup (1): 2014

Individual
Armenian Premier League Best newcomer: 2005
Armenian Premier League The best young quarterback: 2005

References

External links
  
 
 
 Profile at fannet.org
 1fnl.ru
 

1985 births
Living people
Armenian footballers
Armenian expatriate footballers
Armenia international footballers
Association football central defenders
FC Pyunik players
Randers FC players
Jagiellonia Białystok players
FC SKA-Khabarovsk players
FC Aktobe players
FC Amkar Perm players
FC Shakhter Karagandy players
Armenian Premier League players
Danish Superliga players
Ekstraklasa players
Russian Premier League players
Kazakhstan Premier League players
Armenian expatriate sportspeople in Poland
Armenian expatriate sportspeople in Russia
Armenian expatriate sportspeople in Kazakhstan
Expatriate men's footballers in Denmark
Expatriate footballers in Poland
Expatriate footballers in Russia
Expatriate footballers in Kazakhstan